Gartin is a surname. Notable people with the surname include:

Carroll Gartin (1913–1966), American politician
Christopher Gartin (born 1968), American actor and producer

See also
Martin (name)
Partin